Embedded In Baghdad is a 2003 documentary created by Alexandre Trudeau for the CTV Television Program W-FIVE.  It documents Trudeau's experience before, during, and after the US Bombing Campaign with the A-Saadi family, a middle-class family living in Baghdad.

External links and references
Sacha Trudeau remembers Iraq in documentary.
jujufilms

Canadian documentary television films
Documentary films about the Iraq War
CTV Television Network original programming
2000s Canadian films